Vriesea zamorensis is a plant species in the genus Vriesea. This species is endemic to Ecuador.

Cultivars
 Vriesea 'Elan'
 Vriesea 'Grande'

References

BSI Cultivar Registry Retrieved 11 October 2009

zamorensis
Flora of Ecuador